The 2023 Le Samyn was the 55th edition of the Le Samyn road cycling one day race in Belgium. It was a 1.1-rated event on the 2023 UCI Europe Tour and the first event in the 2023 Belgian Road Cycling Cup.

Teams
Seven UCI WorldTeams, seven UCI ProTeams, and seven UCI Continental teams made up the twenty-one teams that participated in the race. 73 of 145 riders finished the race.

UCI WorldTeams

 
 
 
 
 
 
 

UCI ProTeams

 
 
 
 
 
 
 

UCI Continental Teams

Result

References

External links 
 

Le Samyn
Le Samyn
Le Samyn